The Apollo Stakes is an Australian Turf Club Group 2 Thoroughbred horse race for three years and older, held under Weight for Age conditions over a distance of 1400 metres at Randwick Racecourse, Sydney, Australia in February. Total prize money for the race is A$250,000.

History

Name
1977–2006 - Apollo Stakes
2007–2010 - Winning Edge Presentations Classic
2011 onwards - Apollo Stakes

Grade
1977–1978 -  Principal Race
1979 onwards - Group 2

Venue
 1977–1992 - Randwick Racecourse
 1993–2001 - Warwick Farm Racecourse 
 2002–2005 - Randwick Racecourse
 2005–2012 - Rosehill Gardens Racecourse
 2014 onwards - Randwick Racecourse

Winners

 2023 - Anamoe
 2022 - Think It Over
 2021 - Colette
 2020 - Alizee
 2019 - Winx
 2018 - Endless Drama
 2017 - Winx
 2016 - Winx
 2015 - Contributer
 2014 - Appearance
 2013 - Alma's Fury
 2012 - Rain Affair
 2011 - Melito
 2010 - Danleigh
 2009 - Tuesday Joy
 2008 - Racing To Win
 2007 - Desert War
 2006 - Ike's Dream
 2005 - Grand Armee
 2004 - Private Steer
 2003 - Lonhro
 2002 - Ha Ha
 2001 - Sunline
 2000 - Sunline
 1999 - Kidman's Cove
 1998 - Quick Flick
 1997 - Juggler
 1996 - Juggler
 1995 - Pharaoh
 1994 - Burst
 1993 - Naturalism
 1992 - Quick Score
 1991 - Triscay
 1990 - Key Dancer
 1989 - Beau Zam
 1988 - At Sea
 1987 - Diamond Shower
 1986 - Drawn
 1985 - Red Anchor
 1984 - Emancipation
 1983 - Dalmacia
 1982 - Calm Joe
 1981 - Red Nose
 1980 - Embasadora
 1979 - Scomeld
 1978 - Just Ideal
 1977 - Visit

See also
 List of Australian Group races
 Group races

External links 
First three placegetters Apollo Stakes (ATC)

References

Horse races in Australia